Huntshaw Cross transmitting station is a telecommunications facility serving North Devon including the towns of Barnstaple and South Molton. It broadcasts television, radio and mobile telephone services and is currently owned by Arqiva. It is located on the B3232 road at Huntshaw, Great Torrington. Grid reference SS527220.

The site was opened by the Independent Television Authority on 22 April 1968 carrying the ITV programmes of Westward Television using the now defunct 405 line VHF transmission system. In this context, the site was treated as an off-air relay of Stockland Hill.

625 line UHF colour TV transmissions commenced on 5 November 1973. The high power output of the UHF transmitter and its location allowed its signal to be received clearly in parts of south Wales. From 1985 and before Freeview it became a popular transmitter from which to receive Channel 4 which was not broadcast on Welsh transmitters (Channel 4 launched in 1982, but wasn't available from Huntshaw Cross until the summer of 1984). Evidence of this can easily be seen in Swansea (for instance) where many Group C/D TV aerials can be seen pointing south, across the water.

The 405-line transmissions from Huntshaw Cross were discontinued in the 2nd quarter of 1983, somewhat before the final UK-wide shutdown of the VHF system in January 1985.

Digital switchover began at the site in the early hours of 1 July 2009 when the BBC Two analogue service was switched off just after 01:20 BST. Switchover was completed in the early hours of 29 July 2009 with the analogue services disappearing one by one, starting with BBC One at a few seconds after 01:30. Viewers were required to perform another retune on 30 September 2009 as SDN, Arqiva A and Arqiva B reached their final frequency positions. Final post-DSO power levels were not reached by all multiplexes on this transmitter until March 2012.

Freeview HD became available to viewers using this site from 24 September 2010.

A local DAB multiplex for North Devon began transmitting on 2 February 2012 ahead of full launch on 6 February 2012, the local DAB service is an exact mirror of the DAB service for Exeter and Torbay.

Channels listed by frequency

Analogue television

22 April 1968 – 5 November 1973

5 November 1973 – 1 November 1982
UHF colour television commenced.

1 November 1982 - Second Quarter 1983
The UK's fourth UHF television channel started up, but wasn't broadcast from Huntshaw Cross until summer 1985.

Second Quarter 1983 - March 1997
405 line television was discontinued early, and for the next 14 years only the four primary analogue UHF channels were radiated.

March 1997 - 1 November 1998
The fifth UK analogue UHF channel was added.

Analogue and Digital television

1 November 1998 – 1 July 2009
The initial roll-out of digital television involved running the digital services interleaved (and at low ERP) with the existing analogue services.

1 July 2009 – 29 July 2009
Digital Switchover started at Huntshaw Cross. The analogue BBC2 service on channel 62 was switched off, along with the BBC Mux 1 service on channel 54- and the new "BBC A" multiplex started up on the newly vacated channel 62 at full post-DSO power.

Digital television

23 July 2009 – 30 September 2009
All the remaining analogue TV channels were shut down and the new post-DSO digital multiplexes for the PSB channels started up at full power. Huntshaw Cross was subject to a complex multi-stage switchover, and the COM multiplexes (Mux A, Mux C and Mux D) were not switched from their pre-DSO configurations immediately.

30 September 2009 – 28 March 2012
With the post-DSO retune event at Mendip, the post-DSO COM multiplexes replaced the pre-DSO COM multiplexes on their final channel allocations, though only the SDN multiplex gained full power at this point.

28 March 2012 - May 2013
With the second post-DSO retune event at Mendip, the Arq A and Arq B multiplexes gained full power.

From May 2013
Yet another retune was needed in May 2013 as part of the Europe-wide tactic of clearing Band V above 800 MHz so as to make space for future 4G mobile phone services. The BBC A multiplex was reassigned to channel 50.

From 19 June 2019 
A retune will be needed from 19 June 2019 due to the 700 MHz clearance programme.  The recommended television aerial for Huntshaw Cross will change from group C/D to group A.

Analogue radio

Digital Radio

References

External links
MB21's page on 405 TV to Wales and the West
"405 Alive's list of transmitters"
More details on 405-line ITV transmitters
Entry at The Transmission Gallery
UKfree.tv information on Huntshaw Cross
Huntshaw Cross Transmitter at thebigtower.com

Buildings and structures in Devon
Transmitter sites in England